The Canadian Canoe Museum is a museum dedicated to canoes located in Peterborough, Ontario, Canada. The museum's mission is to preserve and share the culture and history of the canoe.

History 
It was founded as the Kanawa Museum, which was also called the Kanawa International Collection of Canoes, Kayaks and Rowing Craft, in 1957 by Kirk Wipper at Camp Kandalore, north of Minden, Ontario, when a friend presented Professor Wipper with a dugout made circa 1890. Over the years, the collection grew. It was housed inadequately in wooden buildings at Kandalore, and by the late 1980s it was becoming clear that a new home would be needed. Wipper transferred control of his historic collection in 1994 to the organization now called the Canadian Canoe Museum. The museum now holds the largest collection of its kind, with more than 600 canoes and kayaks, and a thousand related artifacts.  The museum opened its doors to the public at its new location on Canada Day in 1997.

In May 2006, Prince Andrew, as a member of the Canadian Royal Family, accepted the invitation to become the royal patron of the museum, and visited on May 11 to celebrate its 10th anniversary. He also donated three canoes, originally built in the area of Peterborough, and gifted to the Royal Family between 1947 and 1981, on long-term loan.

Exhibits

The Canadian Canoe Museum's exhibits explore how the canoe defines the Canadian character and spirit.  As well as the canoe collection, the museum features a dramatic waterfall, and a traditional Mi'kmaq wigwam where visitors can hear creation stories.  Visitors can also try their hand at building a birch bark canoe in the Preserving Skills Gallery, plan a prospecting expedition like in the gold rush days, feel what it was like to be a voyageur during the fur trade era, and enjoy the cottaging lifestyles of the early 20th century.

A notable exhibit started in October 2001, when the museum gained further prominence with the launch of Reflections: The Land, the People and the Canoe.  This landmark exhibit featured Pierre Trudeau's famous buckskin jacket and birch bark canoe on public display for the first time, along with the personal artifacts of other significant paddlers, including Bill Mason, Victoria Jason and Eric Morse.

Visiting information
The Canadian Canoe Museum is located on 910 Monaghan Road, Peterborough. The museum is fully wheelchair accessible, and parking is free. The museum's hours and admission rates are available on its website.

Affiliations
The museum is affiliated with: Canadian Museums Association,  Canadian Heritage Information Network, and Virtual Museum of Canada.

References

External links

 Canadian Canoe Museum website
 Map to the Canadian Canoe Museum
 Kirk Albert Walter Wipper Official Web Site
 "Who was Kirk Wipper" from David Spencer's Education Paragon

History museums in Ontario
Museums established in 1957
Transport museums in Ontario
Organizations based in Canada with royal patronage
Museums in Peterborough, Ontario
Mus
1957 establishments in Ontario